Sysavath Thammavongchit is a Laotian long-distance runner.

Personal bests
5000m - 15:27.06 (Kuala Lumpur 2017)
10,000m - 33:02.86 (Singapore 2015)
3000m steeplechase - 9:37.41 (Singapore 2015)

References

http://www.all-athletics.com/node/358737

Living people
Laotian male long-distance runners
1991 births